SPPD may refer to:
Saint Paul Police Department, the abbreviation for the Saint Paul Police Department
St. Petersburg Police Department, the abbreviation for the St. Petersburg Police Department 
San Paro Police Department, the abbreviation for the fictional San Paro Police Department on the APB Reloaded game.